Cedardale, Ontario may refer to:
Cedardale, Lanark County, Ontario
Cedardale, Ottawa, Ontario
Cedardale (West Vancouver)